is a city located in Wakayama Prefecture, Japan. , the city had an estimated population of 27,491 in 14649 households and a population density of 110 persons per km². Shingū literally means 'New Shrine' and refers to Hayatama Shrine, one of the Three Grand Shrines of Kumano (See). The 'old shrine' would be Kamikura Shrine.

Geography
Shingū is located near the southern tip of Wakayama Prefecture on the Kii Peninsula, on the west side of the mouth of the Kumano River. It faces the Pacific Ocean to the east. Parts of the city are within the limits of the Yoshino-Kumano National Park.

Neighboring municipalities
Wakayama Prefecture
Tanabe
Kozagawa
Nachikatsuura
Mie Prefecture
Kumano
Kihō
Nara Prefecture
Totsukawa

Climate
Shingū has a Humid subtropical climate (Köppen Cfa) characterized by warm summers and cool winters with light to no snowfall. The area is subject to typhoons in summer.

Demographics
Per Japanese census data, the population of Shingū has decreased steadily over the past 60 years.

History
The area of the modern city of Shingū was within ancient Kii Province, and per the Nihon Shoki was the home of the Kumano Kuni no miyatsuko, a local king ruling the Kumano region which straddles what is now southern Wakayama and Mie prefectures. The settlement had prospered since before the Kamakura period as a timber distribution center using the Kumano River, and as an entrance to the Kumano Sanzan shrines. During the Edo period,  it was part of the holdings of the Kii Tokugawa clan, and was the castle town of the Shingū Domain during the Edo period. After the Meiji restoration, the area became part of the Higashimuro District, Wakayama, and the town of Shingū was established with the creation of the modern municipalities system on April 1, 1889. Shingū and the neighboring town of Miwasaki merged to form the city of Shingū on October 1, 1933. Shingū annexed the village of Takeda on September 30, 1956. On October 1, 2005, the town of Kumanogawa (from Higashimuro District), an exclave between Nara and Mie prefectures, was merged with Shingū.

Government
Shingū has a mayor-council form of government with a directly elected mayor and a unicameral city council of 15 members. Shingū contributes one member to the Wakayama Prefectural Assembly. In terms of national politics, the city is part of Wakayama 3rd district of the lower house of the Diet of Japan.

Economy
Shingū is the central commercial city of the Kumano Region and is one of the largest cities in Wakayama Prefecture. Primary industries include forestry, commercial fishing, growing of leafy vegetables such as komatsuna and horticulture, and "Kumano brand" beef. Secondary industries are centered around timber and paper processing.

Education
Shingū has five public elementary schools and five public middle schools operated by the city government and two public high schools operated by the Wakayama Prefectural Department of Education. The city also has one private middle school and one private high school. The prefecture also operates one special education school for the handicapped, and one vocational education school.

Transportation

Railway
 JR Tōkai – Kisei Main Line

 JR West – Kisei Main Line
 -  -

Highway
  Nachikatsuura-Shingū Road

Local attractions 
Shingū Castle ruins, National Historic Site
Kumano Hayatama Taisha, one of the Kumano Sanzan shrines
Ōmine Okugakemichi and the Kumano Kodō, parts of the Sacred Sites and Pilgrimage Routes in the Kii Mountain Range, a UNESCO World Heritage Site
Kumano River
Kamikura Shrine, with the object of worship a great sacred rock called "".

Cuisine
A main dish is Nare-zushi, a very traditional type of sushi which, centuries ago, was imported from Southeast Asia to China, and from China to Japan. Narezushi was the birth of sushi, and influenced how the Japanese later made their own styles of sushi that most of us know today.

Sister city relations
  Santa Cruz, California.

Notable people from Shingū 
Yasuyuki Kishino, football player and manager
Haruo Satō, former novelist and poet
Kenji Nakagami, novelist

References

External links 

  
 Shingu City Tourist Association

Cities in Wakayama Prefecture
Populated coastal places in Japan
Shingū, Wakayama